Neorcarnegia is a genus of moths in the family Saturniidae first described by Max Wilhelm Karl Draudt in 1930.

Species
Neorcarnegia basirei (Schaus, 1892)
Neorcarnegia bispinosa Naumann, 2006

References

Ceratocampinae